WFGR (98.7 FM) is an American radio station serving Grand Rapids, Michigan.  It transmits from their facility in Alpine Township.  WFGR is owned by Townsquare Media.

The WFGR signal can be heard as far north as Stanwood, Michigan, far east as Pewamo, Michigan, and as far south as Plainwell, Michigan.

History
WFGR was previously a classical music station throughout the 1990s, broadcasting the World Classical Network from WFCC-FM in Chatham, Massachusetts.  It changed its format to oldies music as "Oldies 98.7" on October 11, 2004 when Grand Rapids' current oldies station at the time, WODJ, was displaced by rock station WKLQ.

When WFGR debuted its oldies format, it was satellite-fed using ABC Radio's "Oldies Radio" feed, but soon debuted a mostly-local lineup of DJs, playing music from the 1960s and early 1970s. On June 29, 2009, the station changed its name to Classic Hits "98.7 WFGR" and began to focus more on the 1970s and 1980s.  The change left the Grand Rapids market without a local outlet for oldies in the traditional sense of the format, until Grand Valley State University stepped in to fill the void by flipping its WGVU from NPR news and talk to "Real Oldies" a few months later.

WFGR currently plays a wide variety of Pop, Rock, Disco and Funk from the mid-1960s to the late 1980s, after having somewhat of a more Classic Rock focus in its first incarnation of "Classic Hits"   WFGR is considered to be the next generation of Oldies, branded as "Classic Hits". The stations image and delivery is that of a CHR/Top 40 station of the late 1970s or early 1980s.

On October 5, 2009, The Bob & Tom Show premiered on the morning lineup, Monday through Saturday mornings.  The show was added when Clear Channel's 101.3 The Fox WBFX did not renew the contract for the show. As of October 5, 2012, three years to the day after their premiere, Bob and Tom were replaced with local talent Andy O' Riley and Dave Kaechele. In late 2013, Local Mid-Day DJ Matt Hendricks was cut from the staff and replaced with a company voice-tracked Big Joe Henry based out of New Jersey. Andy and Dave were also cut from the staff in January 2014, due to low ratings. In early 2014, part-time Jock Lauren was promoted to middays, and Jo Jo Girard, formerly of Mix 106.5 Baltimore and 104.5 WSNX (Sunny FM) was introduced as the new WFGR Morning show host. Weekends on WFGR include  American Top 40 - The '80s with Casey Kasem and America's Greatest Hits with Scott Shannon.

Jingles
In recent years, WFGR has used re-sung versions of cuts from several classic JAM Creative Productions jingle packages from the 1970s and 1980s.  Among these is a version of WHTZ New York's legendary "Serving the Universe" top-of-the-hour ID, with "Serving the Universe" replaced by "Serving West Michigan."

Sources
Michiguide.com - WFGR History

External links

FGR-FM
Classic hits radio stations in the United States
Radio stations established in 1992
Townsquare Media radio stations